The Life of Riley is a 1949 American comedy film directed by Irving Brecher and starring William Bendix, Rosemary DeCamp and James Gleason. It was based on the popular radio show of the same title.

Synopsis
A well-meaning factory employee is struggling financially. His career gets a lift when he receives a promotion, but this causes resentment among his fellow workers who believe it is due to the fact his daughter is engaged to the factory owner's son.

Main cast
 William Bendix as Chester A. Riley
 Rosemary DeCamp as Peg Riley
 James Gleason as Gillis
 Bill Goodwin as Sidney Monahan
 Beulah Bondi as Miss Martha Bogle
 Meg Randall as Barbara "Babs" Riley
 Richard Long as Jeff Taylor
 Lanny Rees as Junior Riley
 Mark Daniels as Burt Stevenson
 Ted de Corsia as Norman
 John Brown as Digby "Digger" ODell
 Victoria Horne as Lucy Monahan
 William E. Green as Carl Stevenson

Radio adaptation
William Bendix and Rosemary DeCamp reprised their roles in an hour-long radio adaptation of the film that was presented on Lux Radio Theatre on May 8, 1950.

References

Bibliography
 James Monaco. The Encyclopedia of Film. Perigee Books, 1991.

External links
 

1949 films
1949 comedy films
American comedy films
Universal Pictures films
Films directed by Irving Brecher
Films with screenplays by Irving Brecher
Films based on radio series
Films scored by Frank Skinner
American black-and-white films
1940s English-language films
1940s American films